The year 1965 in architecture involved some significant architectural events and new buildings.

Events
 Reconstruction of Skopje in Yugoslavia planned by Kenzō Tange and team.

Buildings and structures

Buildings opened

 August 15 – Cathedral of Our Lady Assumed into Heaven and St Nicholas, Galway, Ireland, designed by John J. Robinson, is dedicated.
 September – Toronto City Hall in Toronto, Ontario, Canada.
 October 6
 Skylon Tower in Niagara Falls, designed by B+H Architects.
 Post Office Tower in London, UK, designed by Eric Bedford and G. R. Yeats and topped out in 1964, is officially opened by Prime Minister Harold Wilson.
 October 28 – Gateway Arch (opened as Jefferson National Expansion Memorial) in St. Louis, Missouri, designed by Eero Saarinen.
 November 19 – Arctic Cathedral, Tromsø, Norway, designed by Jan Inge Hovig, is dedicated.
 December 28 – Museo de Arte de Ponce, Puerto Rico, designed by Edward Durell Stone.
 Shalom Meir Tower in Tel-Aviv, Israel, designed by Yitzhak Pearlstein, Gideon Ziv and Meir Levy.
 The first phase of the University of California, Irvine campus, designed by William Pereira.
 The first phase of the University of California, Santa Cruz campus, designed by John Carl Warnecke.

Buildings completed
 Akosombo Dam, Ghana.
 Holyoke Center at Harvard University, Boston, United States, designed by Josep Lluís Sert.
 Richard J. Daley Center in Chicago, United States, designed by Jacques Brownson of C. F. Murphy Associates.
 NASA Vertical Assembly Building at Kennedy Space Center Launch Complex 39, Florida, United States.
 Seinajoki Town Hall in Finland, designed by Alvar Aalto.
 St Michael and All Angels Church, Woodchurch, Birkenhead, England, designed by Richard O'Mahony of F. X. Velarde Partners.
 Nozema Zendstation, The Hague, Netherlands.
 Elephant and Rhinoceros Pavilion, London Zoo, designed by Hugh Casson and Neville Conder.

Awards
 Architecture Firm Award – Wurster, Bernardi & Emmons
 RAIA Gold Medal – Osborn McCutcheon
 RIBA Royal Gold Medal – Kenzo Tange

Births
 April 13 – Patricio Pouchulu, Argentine architect
 Diébédo Francis Kéré, Burkinabè architect
 Monica Ponce de Leon, Venezuelan-born architect and educator
 Kerstin Thompson, Australian architect

Deaths

 January 11 – Florestano Di Fausto, Italian architect working around the Mediterranean (born 1890)
 January 23 – Ingrid Wallberg, Swedish architect (born 1890)
 May 10 – Karl Burman, Ukrainian-Estonian architect and painter (born 1882)
 June 21 – Kay Fisker, Danish architect, designer and educator (born 1893)
 August 6 – Donald McMorran, English neo-Georgian architect (born 1904)
 August 27 – Le Corbusier (Charles Edouard Jeanneret), Swiss-French architect, designer, painter, urban planner and writer (born 1887)
 September 13 – Louis Laybourne Smith, Australian architect and educator (born 1880)
 November 30 – William Strudwick Arrasmith, American architect, designer of Greyhound bus stations (born 1898)

References

 
20th-century architecture